Ecphora gardnerae is a species of extinct predatory ocenebrinid murex gastropod.  Shells of E. gardnerae are found in Miocene-aged marine strata of Maryland and Virginia.

Subspecies
Subspecies include:
 Ecphora gardnerae gardnerae, the nominate subspecies

Geological history

This species of large carnivorous sea snail lived  during the Miocene epoch, and became extinct more than five million years ago.

This species was previously known as Ecphora quadricostata, but that name is now restricted to a species which is found from Pliocene strata in Virginia to Florida.  The Miocene-aged specimens found in Maryland have been assigned to a different taxon, Ecphora gardnerae.

Life habits
As with most other muricids, Ecphora sea snails bored holes through the hard shells of other mollusks, usually bivalves, or sometimes other snails, including other, smaller Ecphoras, in order to feed on their soft insides using a toothed, ribbonlike appendage (common to almost all gastropods) known as a radula.

Commemoration of the fossil
In March 1994, Dr. Eric Seifter testified before the Maryland Legislature that the classification of the Maryland State Fossil, Ecphora quadricostata was invalid (quadricostata is not actually found in Maryland) and needed to be changed to Ecphora gardnerae gardnerae. The fossil was named for geologist Julia Anna Gardner.

References

 D. Wilson. 1987. Species of Ecphora, including the subgenus Stenomphalus, in the Pungo River Formation. Smithsonian Contributions to Paleobiology 61:21-30

External links
Maryland Geological Survey: Maryland's Official State Fossil Shell

Ocenebrinae
Miocene gastropods
Symbols of Maryland
Fossil taxa described in 1987